Victoria Azarenka and Zheng Saisai were the defending champions, but Azarenka chose not to participate and Zheng chose to compete in Doha instead.

Desirae Krawczyk and Giuliana Olmos won the title, defeating Kateryna Bondarenko and Sharon Fichman in the final, 6–3, 7–6(7–5).

Seeds

Draw

Draw

References

External Links
Main Draw

Abierto Mexicano Telcel - Doubles
Women's Doubles